Beryozovka or Berezovka is the name of several inhabited localities in Russia.

Modern localities

Altai Krai
As of 2012, twelve rural localities in Altai Krai bear this name:
Berezovka, Barnaul, Altai Krai, a settlement in Nauchnogorodokskaya Settlement Administration under the administrative jurisdiction of Leninsky City District under the administrative jurisdiction of the city of krai significance of Barnaul; 
Berezovka, Charyshsky District, Altai Krai, a selo in Berezovsky Selsoviet of Charyshsky District; 
Berezovka, Khabarsky District, Altai Krai, a settlement in Martovsky Selsoviet of Khabarsky District; 
Berezovka, Krasnogorsky District, Altai Krai, a selo in Berezovsky Selsoviet of Krasnogorsky District; 
Berezovka, Krasnoshchyokovsky District, Altai Krai, a selo in Berezovsky Selsoviet of Krasnoshchyokovsky District; 
Berezovka, Pervomaysky District, Altai Krai, a selo in Berezovsky Selsoviet of Pervomaysky District; 
Berezovka, Pospelikhinsky District, Altai Krai, a settlement in Klepechikhinsky Selsoviet of Pospelikhinsky District; 
Berezovka, Rubtsovsky District, Altai Krai, a settlement in Bezrukavsky Selsoviet of Rubtsovsky District; 
Berezovka, Shipunovsky District, Altai Krai, a settlement in Bobrovsky Selsoviet of Shipunovsky District; 
Berezovka, Soloneshensky District, Altai Krai, a selo in Berezovsky Selsoviet of Soloneshensky District; 
Berezovka, Tyumentsevsky District, Altai Krai, a selo in Berezovsky Selsoviet of Tyumentsevsky District; 
Berezovka, Zmeinogorsky District, Altai Krai, a settlement in Karamyshevsky Selsoviet of Zmeinogorsky District;

Altai Republic
As of 2012, one rural locality in the Altai Republic bears this name:
Berezovka, Altai Republic, a settlement in Ognevskoye Rural Settlement of Ust-Koksinsky District;

Amur Oblast
As of 2012, two rural localities in Amur Oblast bear this name:
Berezovka, Ivanovsky District, Amur Oblast, a selo in Berezovsky Rural Settlement of Ivanovsky District
Berezovka, Zeysky District, Amur Oblast, a selo in Nikolayevsky Rural Settlement of Zeysky District

Arkhangelsk Oblast
As of 2012, one rural locality in Arkhangelsk Oblast bears this name:
Berezovka, Arkhangelsk Oblast, a settlement in Alexeyevsky Selsoviet of Krasnoborsky District

Republic of Bashkortostan
As of 2012, twelve rural localities in the Republic of Bashkortostan bear this name:
Berezovka, Arkhangelsky District, Republic of Bashkortostan, a village in Irnykshinsky Selsoviet of Arkhangelsky District
Berezovka, Aurgazinsky District, Republic of Bashkortostan, a village in Semenkinsky Selsoviet of Aurgazinsky District
Berezovka, Belebeyevsky District, Republic of Bashkortostan, a village in Znamensky Selsoviet of Belebeyevsky District
Berezovka, Birsky District, Republic of Bashkortostan, a selo in Berezovsky Selsoviet of Birsky District
Berezovka, Bizhbulyaksky District, Republic of Bashkortostan, a village in Aitovsky Selsoviet of Bizhbulyaksky District
Berezovka, Blagoveshchensky District, Republic of Bashkortostan, a village in Tugaysky Selsoviet of Blagoveshchensky District
Berezovka, Davlekanovsky District, Republic of Bashkortostan, a selo in Alginsky Selsoviet of Davlekanovsky District
Berezovka, Gafuriysky District, Republic of Bashkortostan, a village in Tabynsky Selsoviet of Gafuriysky District
Berezovka, Karmaskalinsky District, Republic of Bashkortostan, a village in Karmaskalinsky Selsoviet of Karmaskalinsky District
Berezovka, Sterlitamaksky District, Republic of Bashkortostan, a village in Kuganaksky Selsoviet of Sterlitamaksky District
Berezovka, Ufimsky District, Republic of Bashkortostan, a village in Zubovsky Selsoviet of Ufimsky District
Berezovka, Zilairsky District, Republic of Bashkortostan, a village in Kananikolsky Selsoviet of Zilairsky District

Belgorod Oblast
As of 2012, two rural localities in Belgorod Oblast bear this name:
Berezovka, Borisovsky District, Belgorod Oblast, a selo in Borisovsky District
Berezovka, Ivnyansky District, Belgorod Oblast, a selo in Ivnyansky District

Bryansk Oblast
As of 2012, nine rural localities in Bryansk Oblast bear this name:
Berezovka, Karachevsky District, Bryansk Oblast, a settlement in Mylinsky Rural Administrative Okrug of Karachevsky District; 
Berezovka, Klimovsky District, Bryansk Oblast (or Beryozovka), a settlement in Kirillovsky Rural Administrative Okrug of Klimovsky District; 
Berezovka, Klintsovsky District, Bryansk Oblast, a village in Smolevichsky Rural Administrative Okrug of Klintsovsky District; 
Berezovka, Pochepsky District, Bryansk Oblast (or Beryozovka), a village in Polnikovsky Rural Administrative Okrug of Pochepsky District; 
Berezovka, Pogarsky District, Bryansk Oblast, a selo in Yudinovsky Rural Administrative Okrug of Pogarsky District; 
Berezovka, Rognedinsky District, Bryansk Oblast (or Beryozovka), a village in Selilovichsky Rural Administrative Okrug of Rognedinsky District; 
Berezovka, Starodubsky District, Bryansk Oblast (or Beryozovka), a village in Zankovsky Rural Administrative Okrug of Starodubsky District; 
Berezovka, Suzemsky District, Bryansk Oblast (or Beryozovka), a village in Kholmechsky Rural Administrative Okrug of Suzemsky District; 
Berezovka, Zhukovsky District, Bryansk Oblast (or Beryozovka), a village in Grishinoslobodsky Rural Administrative Okrug of Zhukovsky District;

Chelyabinsk Oblast
As of 2012, four rural localities in Chelyabinsk Oblast bear this name:
Berezovka, Argayashsky District, Chelyabinsk Oblast, a village in Kuluyevsky Selsoviet of Argayashsky District
Berezovka, Bredinsky District, Chelyabinsk Oblast, a settlement in Rymniksky Selsoviet of Bredinsky District
Berezovka, Uvelsky District, Chelyabinsk Oblast, a settlement in Kamensky Selsoviet of Uvelsky District
Berezovka, Uysky District, Chelyabinsk Oblast, a settlement in Nizhneustselemovsky Selsoviet of Uysky District

Chuvash Republic
As of 2012, three rural localities in the Chuvash Republic bear this name:
Berezovka, Ibresinsky District, Chuvash Republic, a settlement in Berezovskoye Rural Settlement of Ibresinsky District
Berezovka, Kanashsky District, Chuvash Republic, a village in Malokibechskoye Rural Settlement of Kanashsky District
Berezovka, Krasnochetaysky District, Chuvash Republic, a village in Atnarskoye Rural Settlement of Krasnochetaysky District

Irkutsk Oblast
As of 2012, two rural localities in Irkutsk Oblast bear this name:
Berezovka, Kazachinsko-Lensky District, Irkutsk Oblast, a village in Kazachinsko-Lensky District
Berezovka, Tayshetsky District, Irkutsk Oblast, a selo in Tayshetsky District

Ivanovo Oblast
As of 2012, two rural localities in Ivanovo Oblast bear this name:
Berezovka, Kineshemsky District, Ivanovo Oblast, a village in Kineshemsky District
Berezovka, Zavolzhsky District, Ivanovo Oblast, a village in Zavolzhsky District

Kaliningrad Oblast
As of 2012, five rural localities in Kaliningrad Oblast bear this name:
Berezovka, Bagrationovsky District, Kaliningrad Oblast, a settlement in Gvardeysky Rural Okrug of Bagrationovsky District
Berezovka, Guryevsky District, Kaliningrad Oblast, a settlement in Khrabrovsky Rural Okrug of Guryevsky District
Berezovka, Gvardeysky District, Kaliningrad Oblast, a settlement in Ozerkovsky Rural Okrug of Gvardeysky District
Berezovka, Nemansky District, Kaliningrad Oblast, a settlement in Luninsky Rural Okrug of Nemansky District
Berezovka, Polessky District, Kaliningrad Oblast, a settlement in Saransky Rural Okrug of Polessky District

Kaluga Oblast
As of 2012, three rural localities in Kaluga Oblast bear this name:
Berezovka, Lyudinovsky District, Kaluga Oblast, a village in Lyudinovsky District
Berezovka, Maloyaroslavetsky District, Kaluga Oblast, a village in Maloyaroslavetsky District
Berezovka, Zhizdrinsky District, Kaluga Oblast, a village in Zhizdrinsky District

Republic of Karelia
As of 2012, one rural locality in the Republic of Karelia bears this name:
Berezovka, Republic of Karelia, a settlement in Kondopozhsky District

Kemerovo Oblast
As of 2012, three rural localities in Kemerovo Oblast bear this name:
Berezovka, Kiselyovsk, Kemerovo Oblast, a village under the administrative jurisdiction of Kiselyovsk Town Under Oblast Jurisdiction; 
Berezovka, Krapivinsky District, Kemerovo Oblast, a settlement in Shevelevskaya Rural Territory of Krapivinsky District; 
Berezovka, Leninsk-Kuznetsky District, Kemerovo Oblast, a settlement in Chusovitinskaya Rural Territory of Leninsk-Kuznetsky District;

Republic of Khakassia
As of 2012, one rural locality in the Republic of Khakassia bears this name:
Berezovka, Republic of Khakassia, a village in Novorossiysky Selsoviet of Altaysky District

Kirov Oblast
As of 2012, six rural localities in Kirov Oblast bear this name:
Berezovka, Kiknursky District, Kirov Oblast, a village in Shaptinsky Rural Okrug of Kiknursky District; 
Berezovka, Nemsky District, Kirov Oblast, a settlement under the administrative jurisdiction of Nema Urban-Type Settlement in Nemsky District; 
Berezovka, Oparinsky District, Kirov Oblast, a village in Molomsky Rural Okrug of Oparinsky District; 
Berezovka, Orichevsky District, Kirov Oblast, a village in Kuchelapovsky Rural Okrug of Orichevsky District; 
Berezovka, Sanchursky District, Kirov Oblast, a village in Korlyakovsky Rural Okrug of Sanchursky District; 
Berezovka, Zuyevsky District, Kirov Oblast, a settlement in Oktyabrsky Rural Okrug of Zuyevsky District;

Komi Republic
As of 2012, two rural localities in the Komi Republic bear this name:
Berezovka, Pechora, Komi Republic, a settlement in Chikshino Rural-type Settlement Administrative Territory under the administrative jurisdiction of the town of republic significance of Pechora; 
Berezovka, Priluzsky District, Komi Republic, a village in Guryevka Selo Administrative Territory of Priluzsky District;

Kostroma Oblast
As of 2012, three rural localities in Kostroma Oblast bear this name:
Berezovka, Nerekhtsky District, Kostroma Oblast, a village in Prigorodnoye Settlement of Nerekhtsky District; 
Berezovka, Ostrovsky District, Kostroma Oblast, a village in Alexandrovskoye Settlement of Ostrovsky District; 
Berezovka, Pavinsky District, Kostroma Oblast, a village in Petropavlovskoye Settlement of Pavinsky District;

Krasnoyarsk Krai
As of 2012, five inhabited localities in Krasnoyarsk Krai bear this name.

Urban localities
Beryozovka, Beryozovsky District, Krasnoyarsk Krai, a work settlement in Beryozovsky District

Rural localities
Berezovka, Abansky District, Krasnoyarsk Krai, a selo in Berezovsky Selsoviet of Abansky District
Berezovka, Bogotolsky District, Krasnoyarsk Krai, a village in Yuryevsky Selsoviet of Bogotolsky District
Berezovka, Bolsheuluysky District, Krasnoyarsk Krai, a selo in Berezovsky Selsoviet of Bolsheuluysky District
Berezovka, Irbeysky District, Krasnoyarsk Krai, a village in Talsky Selsoviet of Irbeysky District

Kurgan Oblast
As of 2012, one rural locality in Kurgan Oblast bears this name:
Berezovka, Kurgan Oblast, a village in Maysky Selsoviet of Kargapolsky District;

Leningrad Oblast
As of 2012, one rural locality in Leningrad Oblast bears this name:
Berezovka, Leningrad Oblast, a village under the administrative jurisdiction of Mginskoye Settlement Municipal Formation in Kirovsky District;

Lipetsk Oblast
As of 2012, six rural localities in Lipetsk Oblast bear this name:
Berezovka, Dankovsky District, Lipetsk Oblast, a selo in Berezovsky Selsoviet of Dankovsky District; 
Berezovka, Dobrinsky District, Lipetsk Oblast, a village in Verkhnematrensky Selsoviet of Dobrinsky District; 
Berezovka, Gryazinsky District, Lipetsk Oblast, a village in Verkhnetelelyuysky Selsoviet of Gryazinsky District; 
Berezovka, Stanovlyansky District, Lipetsk Oblast, a selo in Ostrovsky Selsoviet of Stanovlyansky District; 
Berezovka, Terbunsky District, Lipetsk Oblast, a selo in Berezovsky Selsoviet of Terbunsky District; 
Berezovka, Yeletsky District, Lipetsk Oblast, a village in Kazatsky Selsoviet of Yeletsky District;

Moscow Oblast
As of 2012, one rural locality in Moscow Oblast bears this name:
Berezovka, Moscow Oblast, a khutor in Novopetrovskoye Rural Settlement of Istrinsky District;

Nizhny Novgorod Oblast
As of 2012, ten rural localities in Nizhny Novgorod Oblast bear this name:
Berezovka, Kantaurovsky Selsoviet, Bor, Nizhny Novgorod Oblast, a village in Kantaurovsky Selsoviet under the administrative jurisdiction of the town of oblast significance of Bor
Berezovka, Krasnoslobodsky Selsoviet, Bor, Nizhny Novgorod Oblast, a village in Krasnoslobodsky Selsoviet under the administrative jurisdiction of the town of oblast significance of Bor
Berezovka, Lindovsky Selsoviet, Bor, Nizhny Novgorod Oblast, a village in Lindovsky Selsoviet under the administrative jurisdiction of the town of oblast significance of Bor
Berezovka, Ardatovsky District, Nizhny Novgorod Oblast, a selo in Chuvarley-Maydansky Selsoviet of Ardatovsky District
Berezovka, Arzamassky District, Nizhny Novgorod Oblast, a village in Berezovsky Selsoviet of Arzamassky District
Berezovka, Bogorodsky District, Nizhny Novgorod Oblast, a village in Dudenevsky Selsoviet of Bogorodsky District
Berezovka, Koverninsky District, Nizhny Novgorod Oblast, a village in Khokhlomsky Selsoviet of Koverninsky District
Berezovka, Lukoyanovsky District, Nizhny Novgorod Oblast, a village in Lopatinsky Selsoviet of Lukoyanovsky District
Berezovka, Urensky District, Nizhny Novgorod Oblast, a village in Mineyevsky Selsoviet of Urensky District
Berezovka, Vachsky District, Nizhny Novgorod Oblast, a selo in Filinsky Selsoviet of Vachsky District

Novgorod Oblast
As of 2012, two rural localities in Novgorod Oblast bear this name:
Berezovka, Novgorodsky District, Novgorod Oblast, a village in Yermolinskoye Settlement of Novgorodsky District
Berezovka, Okulovsky District, Novgorod Oblast, a village under the administrative jurisdiction of the Settlement of Uglovskoye in Okulovsky District

Novosibirsk Oblast
As of 2012, seven rural localities in Novosibirsk Oblast bear this name:
Berezovka, Bolotninsky District, Novosibirsk Oblast, a village in Bolotninsky District
Berezovka, Iskitimsky District, Novosibirsk Oblast, a settlement in Iskitimsky District
Berezovka, Kupinsky District, Novosibirsk Oblast, a village in Kupinsky District
Berezovka, Kyshtovsky District, Novosibirsk Oblast, a selo in Kyshtovsky District
Berezovka, Novosibirsky District, Novosibirsk Oblast, a settlement in Novosibirsky District
Berezovka, Ordynsky District, Novosibirsk Oblast, a village in Ordynsky District
Berezovka, Zdvinsky District, Novosibirsk Oblast, a settlement in Zdvinsky District

Omsk Oblast
As of 2012, eight rural localities in Omsk Oblast bear this name:
Berezovka, Azovsky Nemetsky natsionalny District, Omsk Oblast, a selo in Berezovsky Rural Okrug of Azovsky Nemetsky National District
Berezovka, Bolsherechensky District, Omsk Oblast, a village in Chebaklinsky Rural Okrug of Bolsherechensky District
Berezovka, Gorkovsky District, Omsk Oblast, a village in Oktyabrsky Rural Okrug of Gorkovsky District
Berezovka, Maryanovsky District, Omsk Oblast, a village in Orlovsky Rural Okrug of Maryanovsky District
Berezovka, Okoneshnikovsky District, Omsk Oblast, a village in Zolotonivsky Rural Okrug of Okoneshnikovsky District
Berezovka, Omsky District, Omsk Oblast, a village in Kalininsky Rural Okrug of Omsky District
Berezovka, Pavlogradsky District, Omsk Oblast, a village in Novouralsky Rural Okrug of Pavlogradsky District
Berezovka, Tavrichesky District, Omsk Oblast, a village in Lyubomirovsky Rural Okrug of Tavrichesky District

Orenburg Oblast
As of 2012, four rural localities in Orenburg Oblast bear this name:
Berezovka, Buzuluksky District, Orenburg Oblast, a selo in Berezovsky Selsoviet of Buzuluksky District
Berezovka, Kvarkensky District, Orenburg Oblast, a selo in Urtazymsky Selsoviet of Kvarkensky District
Berezovka, Sharlyksky District, Orenburg Oblast, a settlement in Sarmanaysky Selsoviet of Sharlyksky District
Berezovka, Sorochinsky District, Orenburg Oblast, a selo in Baklanovsky Selsoviet of Sorochinsky District

Oryol Oblast
As of 2012, seven rural localities in Oryol Oblast bear this name:
Berezovka, Berezovsky Selsoviet, Dmitrovsky District, Oryol Oblast, a village in Berezovsky Selsoviet of Dmitrovsky District
Berezovka, Borodinsky Selsoviet, Dmitrovsky District, Oryol Oblast, a village in Borodinsky Selsoviet of Dmitrovsky District
Berezovka, Kolpnyansky District, Oryol Oblast, a village in Karlovsky Selsoviet of Kolpnyansky District
Berezovka, Krasnozorensky District, Oryol Oblast, a village in Pokrovsky Selsoviet of Krasnozorensky District
Berezovka, Pokrovsky District, Oryol Oblast, a selo in Berezovsky Selsoviet of Pokrovsky District
Berezovka, Sverdlovsky District, Oryol Oblast, a village in Krasnoarmeysky Selsoviet of Sverdlovsky District
Berezovka, Trosnyansky District, Oryol Oblast, a village in Nikolsky Selsoviet of Trosnyansky District

Penza Oblast
As of 2012, five rural localities in Penza Oblast bear this name:
Berezovka, Kolyshleysky District, Penza Oblast, a selo in Berezovsky Selsoviet of Kolyshleysky District
Berezovka, Mokshansky District, Penza Oblast, a settlement in Tsarevshchinsky Selsoviet of Mokshansky District
Berezovka, Neverkinsky District, Penza Oblast, a selo in Berezovsky Selsoviet of Neverkinsky District
Berezovka, Serdobsky District, Penza Oblast, a village in Peschansky Selsoviet of Serdobsky District
Berezovka, Tamalinsky District, Penza Oblast, a selo in Ulyanovsky Selsoviet of Tamalinsky District

Perm Krai
As of 2012, eleven rural localities in Perm Krai bear this name:
Berezovka, Chusovoy, Perm Krai, a village under the administrative jurisdiction of the town of krai significance of Chusovoy
Beryozovka, Beryozovsky District, Perm Krai, a selo in Beryozovsky District
Berezovka, Chernushinsky District, Perm Krai, a village in Chernushinsky District
Berezovka, Ilyinsky District, Perm Krai, a village in Ilyinsky District
Berezovka, Kudymkarsky District, Perm Krai, a settlement in Kudymkarsky District
Berezovka (Lenskoye Rural Settlement), Kungursky District, Perm Krai, a village in Kungursky District; municipally, a part of Lenskoye Rural Settlement of that district
Berezovka (Byrminskoye Rural Settlement), Kungursky District, Perm Krai, a village in Kungursky District; municipally, a part of Byrminskoye Rural Settlement of that district
Berezovka, Okhansky District, Perm Krai, a village in Okhansky District
Berezovka, Suksunsky District, Perm Krai, a village in Suksunsky District
Berezovka, Usolsky District, Perm Krai, a selo in Usolsky District
Berezovka, Yelovsky District, Perm Krai, a village in Yelovsky District

Primorsky Krai
As of 2012, two rural localities in Primorsky Krai bear this name:
Berezovka, Chuguyevsky District, Primorsky Krai, a selo in Chuguyevsky District
Berezovka, Khorolsky District, Primorsky Krai, a selo in Khorolsky District

Pskov Oblast
As of 2012, three rural localities in Pskov Oblast bear this name:
Berezovka, Ostrovsky District, Pskov Oblast, a village in Ostrovsky District
Berezovka, Usvyatsky District, Pskov Oblast, a village in Usvyatsky District
Berezovka, Velikoluksky District, Pskov Oblast, a village in Velikoluksky District

Rostov Oblast
As of 2012, one rural locality in Rostov Oblast bears this name:
Berezovka, Rostov Oblast, a selo in Sandatovskoye Rural Settlement of Salsky District

Ryazan Oblast
As of 2012, four rural localities in Ryazan Oblast bear this name:
Berezovka, Putyatinsky District, Ryazan Oblast, a settlement in Bolsheyekaterinovsky Rural Okrug of Putyatinsky District
Berezovka, Ryazansky District, Ryazan Oblast, a village in Yekimovsky Rural Okrug of Ryazansky District
Berezovka (rural locality), Korovkinsky Rural Okrug, Sapozhkovsky District, Ryazan Oblast, a selo in Korovkinsky Rural Okrug of Sapozhkovsky District
Berezovka (rural locality), Korovkinsky Rural Okrug, Sapozhkovsky District, Ryazan Oblast, a village in Korovkinsky Rural Okrug of Sapozhkovsky District

Sakha Republic
As of 2012, two rural localities in the Sakha Republic bear this name:
Berezovka, Mirninsky District, Sakha Republic, a selo under the administrative jurisdiction of the settlement of Almazny in Mirninsky District
Berezovka, Srednekolymsky District, Sakha Republic, a selo in Berezovsky Natsionalny (Kochevoy) Rural Okrug of Srednekolymsky District

Samara Oblast
As of 2012, seven rural localities in Samara Oblast bear this name:
Berezovka, Bolsheglushitsky District, Samara Oblast, a selo in Bolsheglushitsky District
Berezovka, Chelno-Vershinsky District, Samara Oblast, a settlement in Chelno-Vershinsky District
Berezovka, Kinel-Cherkassky District, Samara Oblast, a selo in Kinel-Cherkassky District
Berezovka, Pokhvistnevsky District, Samara Oblast, a settlement in Pokhvistnevsky District
Berezovka, Shigonsky District, Samara Oblast, a selo in Shigonsky District
Berezovka, Yelkhovsky District, Samara Oblast, a selo in Yelkhovsky District
Berezovka, Yelkhovsky District, Samara Oblast, a village in Yelkhovsky District

Saratov Oblast
As of 2012, eight rural localities in Saratov Oblast bear this name:
Berezovka, Balakovsky District, Saratov Oblast, a selo in Balakovsky District
Berezovka, Balashovsky District, Saratov Oblast, a selo in Balashovsky District
Berezovka, Bazarno-Karabulaksky District, Saratov Oblast, a selo in Bazarno-Karabulaksky District
Berezovka, Engelssky District, Saratov Oblast, a selo in Engelssky District
Berezovka, Marksovsky District, Saratov Oblast, a selo in Marksovsky District
Berezovka, Petrovsky District, Saratov Oblast, a selo in Petrovsky District
Berezovka, Rtishchevsky District, Saratov Oblast, a village in Rtishchevsky District
Berezovka, Turkovsky District, Saratov Oblast, a village in Turkovsky District

Smolensk Oblast
As of 2012, two rural localities in Smolensk Oblast bear this name:
Berezovka, Dorogobuzhsky District, Smolensk Oblast, a village in Knyashchinskoye Rural Settlement of Dorogobuzhsky District
Berezovka, Dukhovshchinsky District, Smolensk Oblast, a village in Prechistenskoye Rural Settlement of Dukhovshchinsky District

Sverdlovsk Oblast
As of 2012, two rural localities in Sverdlovsk Oblast bear this name:
Berezovka, Artinsky District, Sverdlovsk Oblast, a village in Berezovsky Selsoviet of Artinsky District
Berezovka, Irbitsky District, Sverdlovsk Oblast, a village in Novgorodovsky Selsoviet of Irbitsky District

Tambov Oblast
As of 2012, nine rural localities in Tambov Oblast bear this name:
Berezovka, Kirsanovsky District, Tambov Oblast, a village in Sokolovsky Selsoviet of Kirsanovsky District
Berezovka, Mordovsky District, Tambov Oblast, a selo in Lavrovsky Selsoviet of Mordovsky District
Berezovka, Petrovsky District, Tambov Oblast, a village in Plavitsky Selsoviet of Petrovsky District
Berezovka, Rzhaksinsky District, Tambov Oblast, a village in Zolotovsky Selsoviet of Rzhaksinsky District
Berezovka, Sampursky District, Tambov Oblast, a village in Satinsky Selsoviet of Sampursky District
Berezovka, Sosnovsky District, Tambov Oblast, a selo in Degtyansky Selsoviet of Sosnovsky District
Berezovka, Tokaryovsky District, Tambov Oblast, a selo in Abakumovsky Selsoviet of Tokaryovsky District
Berezovka, Umyotsky District, Tambov Oblast, a selo in Berezovsky Selsoviet of Umyotsky District
Berezovka, Uvarovsky District, Tambov Oblast, a selo in Berezovsky Selsoviet of Uvarovsky District

Republic of Tatarstan
As of 2012, eight rural localities in the Republic of Tatarstan bear this name:
Berezovka, Alexeyevsky District, Republic of Tatarstan, a village in Alexeyevsky District
Berezovka, Almetyevsky District, Republic of Tatarstan, a settlement in Almetyevsky District
Berezovka, Almetyevsky District, Republic of Tatarstan, a village in Almetyevsky District
Berezovka, Bugulminsky District, Republic of Tatarstan, a settlement in Bugulminsky District
Berezovka, Chistopolsky District, Republic of Tatarstan, a village in Chistopolsky District
Berezovka, Laishevsky District, Republic of Tatarstan, a selo in Laishevsky District
Berezovka, Nurlatsky District, Republic of Tatarstan, a settlement in Nurlatsky District
Berezovka, Vysokogorsky District, Republic of Tatarstan, a settlement in Vysokogorsky District

Tomsk Oblast
As of 2012, one rural locality in Tomsk Oblast bears this name:
Berezovka, Tomsk Oblast, a village in Pervomaysky District

Tula Oblast
As of 2012, ten rural localities in Tula Oblast bear this name:
Berezovka, Aleksinsky District, Tula Oblast, a village in Spas-Koninsky Rural Okrug of Aleksinsky District
Berezovka, Krasnobuytsky Rural Okrug, Bogoroditsky District, Tula Oblast, a selo in Krasnobuytsky Rural Okrug of Bogoroditsky District
Berezovka, Novopokrovsky Rural Okrug, Bogoroditsky District, Tula Oblast, a village in Novopokrovsky Rural Okrug of Bogoroditsky District
Berezovka, Kamensky District, Tula Oblast, a village in Yazykovsky Rural Okrug of Kamensky District
Berezovka, Kimovsky District, Tula Oblast, a village in Tabolsky Rural Okrug of Kimovsky District
Berezovka, Kireyevsky District, Tula Oblast, a village in Novoselsky Rural Okrug of Kireyevsky District
Berezovka, Leninsky District, Tula Oblast, a village in Prilepsky Rural Okrug of Leninsky District
Berezovka, Novomoskovsky District, Tula Oblast, a village in Gremyachevsky Rural Okrug of Novomoskovsky District
Berezovka, Tyoplo-Ogaryovsky District, Tula Oblast, a village in Bolshe-Ogarevsky Rural Okrug of Tyoplo-Ogaryovsky District
Berezovka, Zaoksky District, Tula Oblast, a village in Simonovsky Rural Okrug of Zaoksky District

Tver Oblast
As of 2012, four rural localities in Tver Oblast bear this name:
Berezovka, Likhoslavlsky District, Tver Oblast, a village in Tolmachevskoye Rural Settlement of Likhoslavlsky District
Berezovka, Maksatikhinsky District, Tver Oblast, a village in Seletskoye Rural Settlement of Maksatikhinsky District
Berezovka, Nelidovsky District, Tver Oblast, a village in Novoselkovskoye Rural Settlement of Nelidovsky District
Berezovka, Zharkovsky District, Tver Oblast, a village in Novoselkovskoye Rural Settlement of Zharkovsky District

Tyumen Oblast
As of 2012, three rural localities in Tyumen Oblast bear this name:
Berezovka, Nizhnetavdinsky District, Tyumen Oblast, a settlement in Berezovsky Rural Okrug of Nizhnetavdinsky District
Berezovka, Uvatsky District, Tyumen Oblast, a village in Ivanovsky Rural Okrug of Uvatsky District
Berezovka, Vagaysky District, Tyumen Oblast, a village in Fateyevsky Rural Okrug of Vagaysky District

Udmurt Republic
As of 2012, three rural localities in the Udmurt Republic bear this name:
Berezovka, Debyossky District, Udmurt Republic, a village in Tolyensky Selsoviet of Debyossky District
Berezovka, Syumsinsky District, Udmurt Republic, a village in Gurinsky Selsoviet of Syumsinsky District
Berezovka, Uvinsky District, Udmurt Republic, a village in Nylginsky Selsoviet of Uvinsky District

Ulyanovsk Oblast
As of 2012, four rural localities in Ulyanovsk Oblast bear this name:
Berezovka, Maynsky District, Ulyanovsk Oblast, a selo under the administrative jurisdiction of Maynsky Settlement Okrug in Maynsky District
Berezovka, Melekessky District, Ulyanovsk Oblast, a settlement under the administrative jurisdiction of Mullovsky Settlement Okrug in Melekessky District
Berezovka, Staromaynsky District, Ulyanovsk Oblast, a selo in Zhedyayevsky Rural Okrug of Staromaynsky District
Berezovka, Veshkaymsky District, Ulyanovsk Oblast, a selo under the administrative jurisdiction of Chufarovsky Settlement Okrug in Veshkaymsky District

Vladimir Oblast
As of 2012, one rural locality in Vladimir Oblast bears this name:
Berezovka, Vladimir Oblast, a village in Muromsky District

Volgograd Oblast
As of 2012, three rural localities in Volgograd Oblast bear this name:
Berezovka, Rudnyansky District, Volgograd Oblast, a selo in Lopukhovsky Selsoviet of Rudnyansky District
Berezovka, Berezovsky Selsoviet, Yelansky District, Volgograd Oblast, a selo in Berezovsky Selsoviet of Yelansky District
Berezovka, Rassvetovsky Selsoviet, Yelansky District, Volgograd Oblast, a selo in Rassvetovsky Selsoviet of Yelansky District

Vologda Oblast
As of 2012, three rural localities in Vologda Oblast bear this name:
Berezovka, Babushkinsky District, Vologda Oblast, a settlement in Timanovsky Selsoviet of Babushkinsky District
Berezovka, Velikoustyugsky District, Vologda Oblast, a village in Teplogorsky Selsoviet of Velikoustyugsky District
Berezovka, Vologodsky District, Vologda Oblast, a village in Veprevsky Selsoviet of Vologodsky District

Voronezh Oblast
As of 2012, five rural localities in Voronezh Oblast bear this name:
Berezovka, Anninsky District, Voronezh Oblast, a selo in Berezovskoye Rural Settlement of Anninsky District
Berezovka, Novokhopyorsky District, Voronezh Oblast, a settlement in Kolenovskoye Rural Settlement of Novokhopyorsky District
Berezovka, Semiluksky District, Voronezh Oblast, a selo in Novosilskoye Rural Settlement of Semiluksky District
Berezovka, Talovsky District, Voronezh Oblast, a settlement in Nizhnekamenskoye Rural Settlement of Talovsky District
Berezovka, Vorobyovsky District, Voronezh Oblast, a selo in Berezovskoye Rural Settlement of Vorobyovsky District

Alternative names
Berezovka, alternative name of Berezovo, a selo in Soltonsky Selsoviet of Soltonsky District in Altai Krai; 
Berezovka, alternative name of Berezovskoye, a selo in Berezovskaya Rural Administration of Yashaltinsky District in the Republic of Kalmykia; 
Berezovka, alternative name of Beryozovsky, a town in Kemerovo Oblast; 
Berezovka, alternative name of Berezovo, a selo in Berezovskaya Rural Territory of Kemerovsky District in Kemerovo Oblast; 
Berezovka, alternative name of Berezovo, a selo in Kostenkovskaya Rural Territory of Novokuznetsky District in Kemerovo Oblast; 
Berezovka, alternative name of Berezovo, a selo in Padunskaya Rural Territory of Promyshlennovsky District in Kemerovo Oblast; 
Berezovka, alternative name of Berezovo, a village in Bayaraksky Selsoviet of Belozersky District in Kurgan Oblast;

See also
Staraya Beryozovka, several rural localities in Russia